Mysterious Monk is a 1967 Stereoscopic 3-D adventure film directed by Arkady Koltsaty starring Vladimir Druzhnikov, Evgeny Zharikov, Valentin Zubkov and Tatyana Konyukhova. It was filmed in the Soviet stereoscopic system “Stereo-70”. For many years it held the record among Soviet stereofilms for the most rentals, for both 3D and 2D screenings.

Plot

Set during the Russian Civil War, Ukraine, in the autumn of 1920, two Chekist former circus performers attempt to foil the plans of the White Russian army, remnants of which have hidden in a monastery. A more experienced Chekist enters the monastery in the guise of Lieutenant Stronsky to uncover the enemy's plans.

Cast

Vladimir Druzhnikov as Vorontsov 
Evgeny Zharikov as Latyshev
Valentin Zubkov as Lobov 
Tatyana Konyukhova as Zinaida Pavlovna
Stanislav Chekan as Yelpidifor
Aleksandr Belyavsky as Stronsky
Pyotr Sobolevsky

References

External links
 

1967 films
1967 adventure films
1960s 3D films
Russian 3D films
Soviet adventure films
Soviet 3D films
Russian Civil War films
1960s Russian-language films